Bic was a French professional cycling team active from 1967 to 1974. It was sponsored by the French consumer goods company Bic.

Major results

Team rosters

1967 
Roster in 1967, age as of 1 January 1967:

1968 
Roster in 1968, age as of 1 January 1968:

1969 
Roster in 1969, age as of 1 January 1969:

1970 
Roster in 1970, age as of 1 January 1970:

1971 
Roster in 1971, age as of 1 January 1971:

1972 
Roster in 1972, age as of 1 January 1972:

1973 
Roster in 1973, age as of 1 January 1973:

1974 
Roster in 1974, age as of 1 January 1974:

References

External links

Defunct cycling teams based in France
Cycling teams established in 1967
Cycling teams disestablished in 1974